is a simmered dish in Japanese cuisine. A nimono generally consists of a base ingredient simmered in shiru stock & seasoned with sake, soy sauce, and a small amount of sweetening. The nimono is simmered in the shiru over a period of time until the liquid is absorbed into the base ingredient or evaporated. The base ingredient for a nimono is typically a vegetable, fish, seafood, or tofu, or some combination of these. The shiru stock for a nimono is generally dashi. Other than sake and soy sauce, the stock can be further flavored by mirin, sugar, salt, vinegar, miso, or other condiments.

Types

 , also : fish, but sometimes vegetables, simmered in a mixture of miso and dashi
 : beef and potato stew, flavoured with sweet soy
The dish first appears in cookbooks in the early 18th century
 : chunks of pork belly stewed in soy, mirin and sake with large pieces of daikon and whole boiled eggs. The Okinawan variation, using awamori, soy sauce and miso, is known as rafuti.
 : Okinawan dish of pork stewed with bone
 : one pot
 : a winter one pot
 : simmered vegetables (i.e. carrots, taros, lotus root, konnyaku, etc.), simmered-down in soy sauce and water until the liquid is almost gone, almost to dryness.

See also
Japanese cuisine
Acqua pazza
Pot-au-feu
Eintopf
Irish stew

References

Bibliography

Japanese cuisine
Japanese soups and stews